Gressittana is a genus of leaf beetles in the subfamily Eumolpinae. It contains only one species, Gressittana sculpturata, which was originally placed in Rhyparida. The genus is endemic to New Guinea, and is named after Judson Linsley Gressitt.

References

Eumolpinae
Monotypic Chrysomelidae genera
Beetles of Oceania
Insects of New Guinea
Endemic fauna of New Guinea